Colette Dowling (born c. 1938) is an American writer best known for her 1981 book The Cinderella Complex: Women's Hidden Fear of Independence, which was a New York Times best-seller. She has a psychotherapy practice in New York.

Bibliography
The Skin Game, 1971
How to Love a Member of the Opposite Sex: a Memoir, 1976
The Cinderella Complex: Women's Hidden Fear of Independence, 1981
Perfect Women: Hidden Fears of Inadequacy and the Drive to Perform, 1988
You Mean I Don't Have to Feel This Way?: New Help for Depression, Anxiety, and Addiction, 1991
Red Hot Mamas: Coming Into Our Own at Fifty, 1996
Maxing Out: Why Women Sabotage their Financial Security, 1998
The Frailty Myth: Women Approaching Physical Equality, 2000

Personal life
Colette Dowling was raised in Baltimore and got a BA from Trinity College in Washington, D.C., 1958. 
Dowling has published eight books, including The Cinderella Complex, an international best-seller translated into 23 languages. She has written essays and articles for The New York Times Magazine, New York, Harpers, and Esquire.

In 2004, Dowling graduated with a master's degree in clinical social work from The Smith College School for Social Work. Following that, she entered training in psychoanalysis at the Institute for Contemporary Psychotherapy in New York, receiving her certificate in psychoanalysis in 2009. She works as a psychotherapist in private practice in Manhattan, and continues to write. Her office is in the Flatiron.

External links

References

Living people
20th-century American writers
20th-century American women writers
21st-century American writers
21st-century American women writers
American feminist writers
1930s births